is a trivia game published by Nintendo and developed by Nintendo EAD in cooperation with NHK. It was released on December 17, 2009 in Japan only.

Gameplay 
Players use Miis as playable characters. Players answer questions about NHK television series. Each player or team gains points for answering correctly and loses points for answering incorrectly.

Types 
There are many game types in this game:

Original-type 
 Kohaku Quiz Kassen
 Remote Panic Q
 Quiz Ring Match
 Rakki Slot Quiz
 Ota no Shimi Visual Quiz
 NHK Quiz 100

NHK-type 
 ジェスチャー ( Gesture )
 クイズ面白ゼミナール ( Quiz Omoshiro Seminar, Quiz Interesting Seminar )
 連想ゲーム ( Renso Game, Word Association Game )
 ためしてガッテン ( Tameshite Gatten, Science For Everyone )

Wii Remote Share 
Six players playing together will be divided onto two teams, and each team shares only one Wii Remote.

References

External links
Official site 

2009 video games
Japan-exclusive video games
Wii games
Wii-only games
NHK
Quiz games
Video games scored by Masaharu Iwata
Video games developed in Japan